The 1979 Hong Kong Urban Council election was held on 8 March 1979 for the six of the 12 elected seats of the Urban Council of Hong Kong. 12,426 voters cast their ballots in the election, nearly 40 per cent of the 31,481 registered electorate, making it the most participated election before the 1983 reform. 

"Queen of the Polls" Elsie Elliott remained the top by receiving more than 8,000 votes, while her running mate Andrew Tu trailing at the 11th place out of 13 candidates and was not elected. Fresh faces Maria Tam and Augustine Chung who were both lawyers and ran as independents were first elected to the Council, while Tam soon became a high-flyer and dominated Hong Kong politics for more than forty years.

Overview of outcome

References

Hong Kong
1979 in Hong Kong
Urban
March 1979 events in Asia
1979 elections in the British Empire